The 2016 Ontario Scotties Tournament of Hearts, the provincial women's curling championship for Southern Ontario, was held January 18 to 24 at the Brampton Curling Club in Brampton, Ontario. The winning Jenn Hanna rink represented Ontario at the 2016 Scotties Tournament of Hearts in Grande Prairie, Alberta.

The final featured two rinks from the Ottawa Curling Club, the #1 ranked team in the world, skipped by Rachel Homan against 2005 Tournament of Hearts runner up Jenn Hanna, making her first provincial appearance since 2012, after taking a few seasons off. Hanna beat the Homan team 10–8 in the final, an upset as the Homan team had only lost one event all season, and led both the World Curling Tour Order of Merit ranking and money list at the time (while Hanna was ranked 69th and 80th respectively).

Qualification process
Qualifying for the provincial Scotties changed for 2016. Eight teams qualified from four regional qualifiers (two each) and a challenge round. The defending champion Julie Hastings rink and the top CTRS team (the Rachel Homan rink) also qualified.

Teams

Round-robin standings

Round-robin results

Draw 1
Monday, January 18, 7:00 pm

Draw 2
Tuesday, January 19, 2:00 pm

Draw 3
Tuesday, January 19, 8:00 pm

Draw 4
Wednesday, January 20, 1:00 pm

Draw 5
Wednesday, January 20, 7:00 pm

Draw 6
Thursday, January 21, 1:00 pm

Draw 7
Thursday, January 21, 7:00 pm

Draw 8
Friday, January 22, 1:00 pm

Draw 9
Friday, January 22, 7:00 pm

Playoffs

1 vs. 2
Saturday, January 23, 2:00 pm

3 vs. 4
Saturday, January 23, 7:00 pm

Semifinal
Sunday, January 24, 9:00 am

Final
Sunday, January 24, 2:00 pm

Qualification
East and west regional qualifiers ran from December 18-December 21, 2015. Two teams from each region qualified. A second set of qualifiers were held in each region will be held January 8–10.

East Qualifier
December 18–20, at the RCMP Curling Club, Ottawa

Teams entered:

Cathy Auld (Port Perry)
Celeste Butler-Rohland (Ottawa)
Nicole Butler-Rohland (Rideau)
Jenn Hanna (Ottawa)
Danielle Inglis (Ottawa Hunt)
Cassandra Lewin (RCMP)
Kayla MacMillan (Rideau)
Sherry Middaugh (Coldwater)
Erin Morrissey (Ottawa)
Samantha Peters (Rideau)
Rhonda Varnes (Rideau)

West Qualifier
December 19–21, at the Guelph Curling Club, Guelph

Teams entered:

Megan Balsdon (Dixie)
Chrissy Cadorin (Thornhill)
Katie Cottrill (Listowel)
Courtney de Winter (Richmond Hill)
Allison Flaxey (Guelph)
Michelle Fletcher (Burlington)
Susan Froud (Stroud)
Karri-Lee Grant (Thronhill)
Jacqueline Harrison (Mississaugua)
Tracey Jones (Arthur)
Emma Joyce (Lindsay)
Mallory Kean (Westmount)
Kerry Lackie (Westmount)
Julie Tippin (Woodstock)
Stephanie Van Huyse (Tam Heather)
Ashley Waye (Royals)

East Qualifier #2
January 8–10 at the West Northumberland Curling Club, Cobourg

Notes:
Courtney de Winter, Susan Froud, Ashley Waye and Stephanie Van Huyse transfer from West

New teams (not in first qualifier):
Diana Favel (Rideau)

West Qualifier #2
January 9–10 at the Listowel Curling Club, Listowel

References

External links

Ontario Scotties Tournament of Hearts
Sport in Brampton
Ontario Scotties Tournament of Hearts
Ontario Scotties Tournament of Hearts